The Wilaya of El Menia is an Algerian Province created in 2019, previously, a delegated wilaya created in 2015. It is located in the Algerian Sahara.

Geography 
The wilaya of El Menia is in the Algerian Sahara, its area 131,220 km²   .

It is delimited by:

 to the north by the Ghardaia Province;
 to the east by the Ouargla Province;
 to the west by the El Bayadh Province and Timimoun Province;
 and to the south by the In Salah Province.

History 
The wilaya of El Menia was created on November 26, 2019 .

Previously, it was a delegated wilaya, created according to the law n° 15–140 of May 27, 2015, creating administrative districts in certain wilayas and fixing the specific rules related to them, as well as the list of municipalities that are attached to it. Before 2019, it was attached to the Ghardaia Province.

Organization of the wilaya 

During the administrative breakdown of 2015, the delegated wilaya of El Menia is made up of 4 communes and 2 Districts:
 1- Mansoura
 2- Hassi Fehal
 3- El Menia
 4- Hassi Gara

List of walis

References 

 
Provinces of Algeria
Sahara
States and territories established in 2019